Çemenebit Sanctuary is a sanctuary (zakaznik) of Turkmenistan.

It is part of Bathyz Nature Reserve. It was established as a watering place for Asiatic wild ass subspecies, the Turkmenian kulans (Equus hemionus kulan).

External links
 http://www.natureprotection.gov.tm/reserve_tm.html
 https://whc.unesco.org/en/tentativelists/5432/

Sanctuaries in Turkmenistan